4-5-6 Trio (subtitled Mood Jazz in Hi Fi) is an album by Fred Katz originally released on Decca in 1959.

Reception

Allmusic gave the album 3 stars.

Track listing
 "Four, Five, Six" (John Pisano) – 3:46
 "Sophisticated Lady" (Duke Ellington, Mitchell Parish, Irving Mills) – 4:15
 "Isn't It Romantic" (Richard Rodgers, Lorenz Hart) – 2:39
 "Delia" (Hal Gaylor) – 4:41
 "Like Someone in Love" (Johnny Burke, Jimmy Van Heusen) – 2:49
 "Krelch" (Gaylor) – 3:24
 "Mountain Air" (Fred Katz) – 3:21
 "Perdido" (Juan Tizol) – 4:45
 "I'm Getting Sentimental Over You" (Ned Washington, George Bassman) – 5:29

Personnel
Fred Katz – cello
Johnny Pisano – guitar
Hal Gaylor – bass

References

1959 albums
Fred Katz (cellist) albums
Decca Records albums